Abdelkrim Nemdil (born 3 October 1989)  يلعب كلش الا كرة القدمis an Algerian footballer who plays for ES Sétif in the Algerian Ligue Professionnelle 1.

References

External links
Profile at FootballDatabase

1989 births
Living people
USMM Hadjout players
ES Sétif players
RC Arbaâ players
CR Belouizdad players
USM El Harrach players
Algerian Ligue Professionnelle 1 players
Algerian footballers
Association football defenders
Footballers from Sétif
21st-century Algerian people